Mia nonna poliziotto (i.e. "My Grandma a Policewoman") is a 1958 Italian comedy film  directed  by Steno and starring Tina Pica.

Plot
The old grandmother Tina arrives in town to attend the wedding of his nephew Alberto with his girlfriend Ileana.

Upon arrival she discovers that she has been stolen of a medallion that her late husband had given her.

He goes to the police station to file a complaint and get the dear object back, but given the length of the investigation, he decides to carry out the search for the thief himself, combining a great deal of mess.

Eventually, by chance, he finds the thief, who lives in the same hotel, also managing to have an entire gang of criminals arrested.

The grandson Alberto can marry the beautiful Ileana and the grandmother Tina will be appointed, by merit, an honorary colonel of the female police.

Cast

 Tina Pica as Grandma Tina
 Mario Riva as  Mario Secchioni
 Lyla Rocco as  Ileana 
 Alberto Lionello as  Alberto 
 Bice Valori as  Francesca
 Alberto Talegalli as  Maresciallo Speranza
 Riccardo Billi as  Belletti
 Ugo Tognazzi as  Ugo
 Raimondo Vianello as  Raimondo
 Paolo Panelli as  Paolo
 Diana Dei as  Ileana's Sister 
 Dante Maggio as Ileana's Father 
 Luigi Pavese as Police Commissioner
 Loris Gizzi as Primary
 Silvio Bagolini as Gustavo Peretti
 Anna Campori as The Landlord
 Enzo Garinei as   Gattinelli

See also
 List of Italian films of 1958

References

External links
 
Mia nonna poliziotto at Variety Distribution 

1950s crime comedy films
Italian crime comedy films
Italian black-and-white films
Films directed by Stefano Vanzina
1958 comedy films
1950s Italian films
1950s Italian-language films